() is a village in Karviná District, Moravian-Silesian Region, Czech Republic. It was a separate municipality but became administratively a part of Orlová in 1946 and now is one of the parts of the town. It has a population of 5,604.

The name, both in Czech and Polish, is a common Slavic name denoting an area cleared by clearcutting of trees.

History 
The village could have been founded by Benedictine monks from an Orlová abbey and was first mentioned in 1447 as Porombka. Politically the village belonged to the Duchy of Teschen, which was since 1327 a fee of the Kingdom of Bohemia, which after 1526 became a part of the Habsburg monarchy.

After the Revolutions of 1848 in the Austrian Empire, a modern municipal division was introduced in the re-established Austrian Silesia. The village as a municipality was subscribed at least since 1880 to political district and legal district of Freistadt.

According to the censuses conducted in 1880, 1890, 1900 and 1910 the population of the municipality grew from 811 in 1880 to 2,753 in 1910. In terms of the language spoken colloquially the majority were Polish-speakers (dropping in percentage from 97.6% in 1880 to 94% in 1900, and then more pronouncly to 59.5% in 1910), accompanied by Czech-speakers (growing from 1.2% in 1880 to 38.9% in 1910) and German-speakers (at most 1.8% in 1900). In terms of religion, in 1910 the majority were Roman Catholics (2,477 or 90%), followed by Protestants (231 or 8.4%%), Jews (33 or 1.2%) and others (12 or 0.4%). The village was also traditionally inhabited by Silesian Lachs, speaking Cieszyn Silesian dialect, additionally industrial growth in the environs lured a large influx of migrant workers, mostly from western Galicia.

After World War I, the fall of Austria-Hungary, the Polish–Czechoslovak War and the division of Cieszyn Silesia in 1920, the village became a part of Czechoslovakia. Following the Munich Agreement, in October 1938 together with the Zaolzie region it was annexed by Poland, administratively organised in Frysztat County of Silesian Voivodeship. The village was then annexed by Nazi Germany at the beginning of World War II. After the war it was restored to Czechoslovakia.

See also 
 Polish minority in the Czech Republic
 Zaolzie

Footnotes

References 
 

Neighbourhoods in the Czech Republic
Villages in Karviná District
Cieszyn Silesia